Timothy Clifton Stack (born November 21, 1954) is an American actor, producer and screenwriter.

Life and career

Education
Timothy was born in Doylestown, Pennsylvania, the son of Joan and Tom Stack. He graduated from the Philadelphia-area prep school Germantown Academy in 1973 and graduated from Boston College in 1978. After graduating, Tim moved to Los Angeles and quickly joined the improvisational comedy group The Groundlings in 1979.

On television

The 1980s
In 1986, he appeared in a five-episode arc of Punky Brewster, as rule-obsessed but unfeeling DCFS social worker Simon Chillings, originally charged with Henry's petition to adopt Punky, but who instead removes her from Henry's care, concerned Henry could not adequately support her after his business burns down and he is hospitalized with an ulcer. Convinced Punky would be permanently better off with another foster family, he places her with a wealthy couple, Jules and Tiffany Buckworth. Ultimately, Jules Buckworth leaves Tiffany and returns Punky to Henry, who completes the adoption. When Simon calls Henry's new studio to congratulate him on the adoption, he reaches Mike, who laughs, reminding him he was the one trying to keep them apart. Simon states that he has quit his job with DCFS and has become romantically involved with Tiffany Buckworth.

The 1990s and early 2000s
In the early 1990s, Stack appeared as the father of the main character on Parker Lewis Can't Lose. He later starred as Dick Dietrick on the raunchy talk show send-up/satire Night Stand with Dick Dietrick.

Stack then played Notch Johnson on Son of the Beach, a Howard Stern-produced Baywatch send-up which aired on the FX cable channel from 2000 to 2002.

Other work
Stack continues to get regular voiceover work, e.g. The Brave Little Toaster film series, as Lampy the orange desktop lamp. Beginning in 2005, Stack started appearing in a recurring sketch on The Tonight Show with Jay Leno called Pumpcast News. In the sketch, Stack plays a fictional cable news reporter who interacts with customers at gas pumps-–sometimes completely taking people off guard. Stack also acted out a fictional version of himself on the television program My Name Is Earl, in which he was depicted as an arrogant, depressed, alcoholic resident of Camden County who frequently hosted beauty pageants and parades.

He also wrote several episodes of Son of the Beach. He also starred as the principal in Idle Hands.

Stack has guest starred in several popular sitcoms over the years, including Benson, Laverne & Shirley, Night Court, The Wonder Years, Seinfeld, Wings, Malcolm in the Middle, Curb Your Enthusiasm, and The Golden Girls. He lives with his wife Jan Stack and their children Murphy and Doyle.

He hosts the computer DVD game Outburst.

Filmography

Films

TV series

Producer/executive producer

Writer

Awards and nominations

References

External links

1954 births
Living people
American male film actors
American male television actors
American television writers
American male television writers
American male voice actors
Boston College alumni
People from Doylestown, Pennsylvania
Germantown Academy alumni
Screenwriters from Pennsylvania